Ballistic is a superhero published by DC Comics. He first appeared in Batman Annual #17 (1993), and was created by Doug Moench and Michael Manley.

Publication history
Ballistic first appeared in Batman Annual # 17 as a part of the Bloodlines event.  He, along with most other Bloodline characters, never really caught on with readers and was relegated to occasional guest appearances and cameos.

Fictional character biography
Kelvin Mao is a Korean-American member of the Gotham City Police Department Tactical Unit sent to face Angon, who was committing murders throughout the city. The entire squad is killed except Mao, who is bitten by Angon and receives massive injuries. Mao is placed in a body-cast at the hospital; this lasts until the alien's bite mutated him; a rare occurrence for bite victims. The alien's bite activates Mao's metagene and he is transformed into a large man with armored skin, superstrength, night vision, and super-hearing. He leaves the hospital and equips himself with munitions, anticipating another meeting with Angon. Ballistic teams with Batman (Jean Paul Valley) to drive Angon out of the city. A short time later, Ballistic joins with several other "New Bloods" to defeat all the spine-sucking aliens.

Ballistic next became a member of the superhero reality show, The Blood Pack, a group filled with many New Bloods. He helps the team beat the Quorum but the team disbands shortly after.  Kelvin then spends some time on his own as a vigilante, occasionally aiding Batman, but soon found another team. Cave Carson's Forgotten Heroes came calling and Ballistic joins them for a mission aiding Resurrection Man.  It seems Ballistic left the Forgotten Heroes after this mission. After that he decides to try the lone vigilante act once again. Later, Mao was tossed out of Guy Gardner's bar, Warrior's, for throwing his weight around.

Infinite Crisis

Ballistic joins with dozens of other superheroes and civilians to defend Metropolis. from attack by the 'Secret Society of Supervillains'. Ballistic teams with several other former members of the Blood Pack to tackle Solomon Grundy. While fighting Grundy, Ballistic, and the other members of the Blood Pack present, along with that incarnation of Grundy, are killed in a blast of heat-vision from the insane Superboy-Prime.

Blackest Night

In Adventure Comics (Vol. 2) #4, the Bloodpack members killed by Superboy-Prime are reanimated as members of the Black Lantern Corps. Superboy-Prime destroyed Ballistic on Earth Prime, using the black ring cycling through the power set of the resulting in a burst of colored energy that destroys Black Lanterns.

Powers and abilities
After receiving a bite from the alien Angon, Ballistic is mutated into a large monster of a man. He gains superstrength, red-armored skin, night vision, and super-hearing. In addition, Mao was trained in tactical operations and is an excellent marksman and combatant.

External links
DCU Guide: Ballistic

References

Characters created by Doug Moench
Comics characters introduced in 1993
DC Comics characters with superhuman strength
DC Comics metahumans
DC Comics male superheroes
Asian-American superheroes
Gotham City Police Department officers
Korean superheroes